Detective Lieutenant II Louie Provenza is a fictional character from TNT's television crime drama franchise The Closer/Major Crimes. He appeared on all seven seasons of The Closer and all six seasons of Major Crimes. The character was created by James Duff, and is portrayed by G. W. Bailey.  Generally referred to as "Provenza", the character's first name was kept secret until his former partner, George Andrews, was heard to use it for the first time in the penultimate episode of the fifth season.  It is said that only captains and above are allowed to address him by his first name and that even his own grandchildren call him "Lieutenant". He is also the only member of his academy class still on active duty with the rest having retired by the beginning of season 2 of Major Crimes.

In Season 2, Episode 15, “Serving the King Part 2” at the 45 minute mark, Brenda calls Provenza, “Jim Provenza.”  She never uses that name again until later in the series he’s called Louie.

In the Closer and Major Crimes universe
Provenza is a Lieutenant II on the Los Angeles Police Department. A veteran of the Robbery/Homicide unit, he is selected to join the Priority Homicide Division. Initially, Provenza has no greater love for Deputy Chief Brenda Leigh Johnson than any of the rest of the unit, but over time he develops a paternal affection for her. The same becomes true when Captain Sharon Raydor takes over the Major Crimes Division. Initially he dislikes Captain Raydor's policy changes but develops a deep respect for her quickly.

Character history
A seasoned veteran of the Robbery/Homicide unit, Provenza is selected to join the elite Priority Homicide Squad in the beginning of the series.  Provenza has served in the LAPD for over thirty years.  In 2013 it is revealed that he is the last member of his LAPD Academy class who is still serving on the department and receives a Last Man Standing trophy with the names of his entire class on it which is sometimes seen throughout Major Crimes. Provenza reveals that he was married five times (twice to the same woman), and in season five he falls in love with another much younger woman, much to his own surprise. Though they get engaged, she breaks it off soon afterwards. However, in Major Crimes season 3 he meets a retired nurse named Patrice Perry who can match wits with him while investigating the murder of her granddaughter Keesha's boyfriend and the apparent attempted murder of Keesha. Provenza and Patrice start a relationship after Provenza arrests Keesha for her boyfriend's murder, something that causes her extended family to dislike him but Patrice doesn't hold against Provenza, particularly after hearing Keesha's disturbing confession. They later get engaged and eventually married. Unlike his other marriages, Provenza's marriage with Patrice appears to be a lasting and supportive one, Patrice being the widow of another cop and thus understanding much of Provenza's struggles. In "Risk Assessment" of Major Crimes, Provenza reveals that his motivation for becoming a police officer is he wanted to help people but hates fire, preferring getting shot to fire. He also states that he enjoys bossing people around as another reason.

At the beginning of The Closer Provenza joins with Priority Homicide's protest of Chief Johnson taking over the division by requesting a transfer. While he tells Flynn he has no intention of helping her, Provenza pretty quickly proves he cares nothing about politics in the pursuit of a killer. By the end of the first season Provenza firmly entrenches himself as Chief Johnson's loyal second in command even going as far as to organize Priority Homicide to thwart Captain Taylor's personally motivated "conduct unbecoming" complaint against Chief Johnson. Provenza is injured during a shooting incident in the murder room in the second season. He and Johnson are both put on leave following the incident.

He and Lt. Andy Flynn have a close, albeit sometimes caustic, friendship. (During the first season he appears to regard Flynn in a gruff and unfriendly manner, before it emerges in later seasons that the two share a rather amiable history.) After four divorces, Provenza apparently has several children—he complains about paying a lot of child support. In "Next of Kin Part 1" he also mentions having a grandson and mentions that he has more than one grandchild in "The Last Word" and "Hindsight, Part 4" while complaining. In the episode "Dial M For Provenza", he reveals to Assistant Chief Will Pope that the terms of his first divorce require him to split his pension with his first wife, so he therefore refuses to retire. Pope sympathizes with him, having made a similar arrangement with his own first wife. In season 5 of Major Crimes, Provenza's first wife remarries, ending his obligations towards her. However, while his new wife Patrice pushes him to retire as he no longer has to share his pension, Provenza chooses to remain out of love for his job.

Lt. Provenza is the senior ranking officer serving in the Major Crimes Division under the unit's commanding officer, Captain Sharon Raydor.  He is almost always in command at a crime scene or in the field if Captain Raydor is not present.  His years of experience as a detective give him keen insight on criminal behavior which serves the MCD well while working cases.  He is often mentoring the younger detectives in his unit whether he wants to or not.  Respecting Provenza's many years experience as a seasoned homicide detective, Captain Raydor often asks Provenza for his assessment of a case or incident. When Raydor first takes over the squad, she and Provenza clash often as Provenza feels he should be in charge and she barely outranks him. He also doesn't like her policy of deal-making. However, as the show goes on, he grows to respect her and acts as a fatherly figure to her adopted son Rusty. In one early episode, when Rusty accuses Raydor of not caring about him, Provenza berates him, telling him he does not like Raydor, but she clearly cares very deeply about Rusty. Provenza's words cause Rusty to realize his mistake and make amends with Raydor. As the show goes on, Provenza gets more supportive of Raydor, occasionally referring to her by her first name and comforting her at times. The two come to have an easy working relationship with mutual respect and Raydor relies on him a lot. In return, Provenza follows Raydor's lead and respects her decisions, even if he doesn't totally agree with them.

Near the end of season 2 of Major Crimes, Provenza discovers he needs glasses after failing his marksmanship test multiple times. He resists at first, originally planning to tell Raydor even though it means desk duty for him, but later uses an elderly suspect's glasses to pass the test after seeing how effective they are after jokingly trying them on. Provenza gets a perfect score on his target with the glasses and later gets a pair of his own. Though he doesn't wear them at all times, he can be seen with them a few times, particularly when he shoots Wade Weller despite him having a hostage and Raydor being convinced that Weller was too close to the hostage to risk a shot. The sheer accuracy of his shot while wearing the glasses clearly leaves Raydor stunned and he informs her of his perfect target earlier. Provenza mainly appears to use the glasses when he is in a situation that requires his gun, their last appearance being during Provenza's standoff with Phillip Stroh in the series finale.

In season 3 of Major Crimes, Provenza meets Patrice Parry, the grandmother of a victim turned suspect in one of his cases. Following the girl's arrest for her boyfriend's murder, Provenza and Patrice go out for a drink and begin dating. Being both a retired nurse and the widow of a cop, Patrice is very understanding and supportive of Provenza's lifestyle and much closer to his age than most of the women he develops an interest in. In "Personal Day," Provenza and Patrice move in together and subsequently get engaged. An argument develops over their wedding until Buzz gets Provenza to agree to elope as Patrice wants. In "Hindsight, Part 5," Provenza and Patrice are married in a small ceremony by the Mayor of Los Angeles attended only by the squad, Fritz Howard, Assistant Chief Taylor, Doctor Morales, DDA Hobbs, SIS Lieutenant Chuck Cooper, Rusty Beck and his boyfriend Gus. It's stated that Patrice's family hates Provenza as they met when he arrested her granddaughter for murder. Following their marriage, Provenza and Patrice live in relative happiness with Patrice continuing to support Provenza through his work as a homicide detective.

While initially hostile to Sharon Raydor, Provenza's opinion of her changes over time. In season 5's "Intersection," Provenza worries about who will become Assistant Chief if Sharon fails to get the job. In turn, Sharon suggests that if she gets the promotion, Provenza can take command of Major Crimes for her, leading to a fond exchange between the two.

In season 6, Provenza is reunited with Detective Camila "Cami" Paige, a young woman whose parents were killed in a hit-and-run years before. Provenza had been the one to bring the killer to justice and remained close with the family afterwards. Camila subsequently transferred to Major Crimes.

After Sharon falls ill with cardiomyopathy in season 6 and collapses as a result during "Sanctuary City, Part 3," Provenza experiences an uncharacteristic loss of temper with two FBI agents, going so far as to throw something across the room. Throughout the season following Sharon's diagnosis, Provenza is one of the most careful with her health and gets visibly emotional in "Conspiracy Theory, Part 3" after learning just how serious it is. Due to her worsening condition, Sharon chooses to take a leave of absence in "Conspiracy Theory, Part 4" and to leave Provenza in charge of Major Crimes while she's gone. She subsequently dies, leaving Provenza in charge more permanently.

In the four-parter "By Any Means," Provenza remains in charge of Major Crimes, but retains his rank of Lieutenant and has not officially been given command. Instead, Provenza is in charge until he is either officially made commander or a new commander is chosen. While reeling from the death of Sharon, the squad has to deal with the murder of DDA Emma Rios and the realization that Phillip Stroh has returned. Provenza struggles with Assistant Chief Mason over how to manage the investigation, but gains more cooperation as Provenza is proven right more and more often. Provenza repeatedly states that he intends to bring Stroh down "by any means" and that he has no intention to take Stroh alive. At the end of "By Any Means, Part 3," Provenza states that if there is one thing he wants to accomplish in his potentially short time commanding Major Crimes it is to remove Phillip Stroh from the face of the Earth.

In "By Any Means, Part 4," Provenza continues his quest to take Stroh down "by any means," resisting bringing in SOB backup so that there will be no chance of Stroh escaping. With Wes having proven that Sharon's condo is not safe, Provenza keeps Rusty and Gus at his side at all times. After realizing that Stroh might be going after his stepsister and with Rusty determined to go after her, Provenza reinstates Buzz to Reserve Detective and along with Rusty and Gus, they visit Stroh's sister, finding her murdered. Provenza finds Stroh on Jim Bechtel's yacht where Provenza manages to corner Stroh, but can't bring himself to shoot an unarmed man. As Stroh apparently goes to surrender, he is shot dead by Rusty. Provenza discovers that Stroh had a hidden gun he was presumably going for and decides to take credit for killing Stroh himself to protect Rusty. Though investigated by FID, Provenza is cleared as its determined that Stroh's death was justified.

At the end of the series, with Stroh dead, Provenza gains full command of Major Crimes though he remains a Lieutenant. Provenza arranges for Buzz to attend the police academy to become an actual detective while Julio takes his promotion and transfer. In the final scene of the series, Provenza gives a speech assuring everyone that together, they will continue bringing down the bad guys and making Major Crimes great for years to come. Provenza suggests that with the team he has he could go on solving crimes forever.

Personality
Unlike most of the squad, Provenza is usually only referred to by his last name or rank of Lieutenant to the point that even his grandchildren call him Lieutenant. When Rusty Beck learns that his first name is Louie, Provenza tells him that "unless you outrank me or I divorced you, my name is Lieutenant." On another occasion, while discussing the possibility of him taking over Major Crimes if Sharon Raydor is promoted to Assistant Chief, Provenza admits that everyone calling him "Captain" rather than "Lieutenant" would be like changing his name.

An old-school detective, Provenza disagrees with many of Johnson's decisions, but nevertheless harbors a grudging respect for her abilities as a detective and gradually becomes one of her most loyal supporters; he is instrumental in rallying the squad when she is in trouble with the ethics board. He has recently been left in her debt due to a foul-up he had with Flynn, and she forces him to pay off the squad for helping keep him and Flynn out of the fire.  At first resenting Captain Raydor as the MCD's new commanding officer, Provenza comes to respect Raydor as an intelligent and shrewd investigator and Lt.  Provenza himself earns Capt. Raydor's respect as she notices how he inspires the unit by his example in his dogged determination to catch the violent criminals that the MCD is pursuing.

Provenza has been divorced five times and is shown to be bitter about it, frequently mentioning his ex-wives in a less-than-stellar way. His failed marriages are a running joke with Andy Flynn commenting at Provenza's sixth wedding that "marriage is a beautiful thing. That's why Provenza does it so much." At one point, Provenza's first wife Liz tells Flynn that Provenza's exes hold meetings once a month and she invites Flynn to come as they consider him the fifth member of their group. After breaking up with his much younger fiancé Lauren, Flynn points out that at least Provenza broke the cycle of his divorces and Provenza gleefully begins destroying everything that represented their relationship. In Major Crimes, when he meets Patrice Perry, Provenza is shown to make a serious effort to make her happy and in return, Patrice is shown to be understanding of some of his hesitations. Their meeting is rather unique as Provenza meets Patrice when he arrests her granddaughter Keesha for the murder of Keesha's boyfriend, something that makes Patrice's family dislike him. When planning their wedding, Provenza ultimately gives in to Patrice's wishes for a small ceremony rather than a big one, taking Buzz's advice to do what makes her happy rather than himself. Provenza is shown to truly love Patrice, being so eager to marry her that he responds to a question with "I do" at the wedding before they even start. Patrice is not Provenza's usual type, as noted by Provenza himself, as she is his own age rather than much younger than him. However, Patrice is very understanding and supportive of Provenza's lifestyle as a homicide detective, having been previously married to another cop before she was widowed. Though Patrice pushes Provenza to retire at one point after his first wife Liz remarries and he thus no longer owes her half his pension, Provenza decides against it and Patrice supports his decision.

He is suspended after a shootout incident in the murder room, but is later reinstated when Johnson makes a deal with the CIA to secretly investigate the murder of an Arab teenager. Provenza helps Johnson greatly in this investigation.  When Capt. Raydor takes command of the MCD, after Chief Johnson's departure, Provenza starts helping Raydor, despite a rocky beginning between the two of them.

Provenza frequently wears a white bucket hat while investigating a crime scene with the other detectives. He also wears it to his wedding in "Hindsight, Part 5". The class clown of the team, he always has a witty one-liner ready, and frequently exclaims "Ye Gods!" when exasperated. However, Provenza has a soft side buried beneath his hard exterior. He reveals small glimpses of it as he slowly warms up to Chief Johnson and begins to show her more respect. Their relationship further improves after the shooting incident in the murder room. He is also very polite to Johnson's mother, which irritates Johnson's father. Provenza's age is often the matter of jokes between the squad. At one point, when Provenza starts talking about his first job, Flynn asks if it was cabin boy on the Mayflower or dishwasher at the Last Supper.
 
Chauvinistic and politically incorrect, Provenza has been forced to attend sensitivity training for his inappropriate behavior and remarks. He has been portrayed enduring a hard time accepting new or different methods for conducting interrogations and solving cases. He resists practically any type of change and initially resented being bossed around by a woman. Above all else, he absolutely hates it when anyone places an item or sits on his desk. Despite this, he comes to respect both Johnson and Raydor. His political incorrectness is best seen when his former partner George Andrews returns as a transgender woman named Georgette. Provenza struggles with the revelation and has a hard time working with his old friend, insisting that Georgette must go back to being a man for the sake of the case. By the end of the episode, Provenza has become more accepting of his friend now being a woman. He develops a close relationship with Rusty Beck, and supports him through Rusty’s realization, struggle, acceptance, and disclosure of his homosexuality. He recognizes Rusty is gay before Rusty does. While Provenza doesn’t have personal experience with gay issues he continues to grow as surrogate grandfather.

A running theme in Major Crimes is that at the beginning of the second season, Provenza buys the squad a new high-tech printer after their original printer breaks between seasons one and two and they have trouble getting it replaced. Provenza begins charging everyone whenever they print something with it. At one point, Russell Taylor states that it's the best printer in the building, though he refuses to pay, citing his superior rank as a reason. As a result of the purchase, the squad is frequently seen putting change in a jar on Provenza's desk throughout the series, sometimes at the prompting of Provenza. The printer, money jar and Provenza's bobblehead are three of the only things that survive the bombing of the murder room at the end of the fifth season, causing Julio Sanchez to comment "roaches, rats and Provenza. They survive anything." The printer sees continued use in the rebuilt and redesigned murder room in the sixth season rather than being replaced along with everything else. It's stated at one point that Provenza insisted on continuing to use it rather than getting a replacement. After getting angry over the behavior of two federal agents during the sixth season, Provenza adds a "federal tax," forcing the agents to pay more to use his printer in retaliation for their behavior.

Provenza, while appearing gruff and hard nosed on the outside, is very sympathetic to the victims of violent crimes and their families. In one episode, after learning that a man used the credit card of a victim that he found in a dumpster to buy his children a Christmas gift because he has no job or money, Provenza is shown to be sympathetic to the point that he gives Tao his own credit card and tells him to get the man the gift he'd wanted before he is released. He is very loyal and protective of the other members of the Major Crimes Unit.  He does not suffer fools or arrogant people and is not afraid to verbally chastise people of that ilk. Cases involving children are shown to hit Provenza especially hard as well as particularly senseless crimes.

Provenza can be very brave in moments of peril.  After their squad confronted a heavily armed sniper in a violent shootout, a wounded Detective Sanchez told Lt. Provenza that he admires and respects him, because in dangerous situations, "You (Lt. Provenza) never back down."

After Captain Raydor takes in young murder witness Rusty Beck, Provenza forms a bond with the boy, becoming someone Rusty trusts to ask for advice and talk to. While dealing with Rusty's abusive father, Provenza, who is vocally against making deals with criminals, is very pleased for once with the outcome of their deal, saying it's the best one they've ever made and getting the entire team to act as witnesses on the agreement. When Raydor tells Rusty he has a family among them, Provenza agrees. After an incident where Rusty yells that Raydor doesn't care about him and only wants to get rid of him, Provenza notices how upset she is and berates Rusty telling him that while he doesn't like Raydor, she clearly cares a great deal about Rusty. Rusty is immediately sorry when he realizes Provenza's right and sees Raydor's reaction and Provenza shows disgust for what he did. His words cause Rusty to make up with Raydor. Provenza also takes Rusty in for a week when it's too dangerous for him to live with Raydor anymore due to Wade Weller and congratulates him on his testimony in the trial, trying to cheer him up. When Rusty admits to the squad that he is gay, like the rest of the squad, Provenza tries to act surprised but clearly isn't, having grown close enough to Rusty to tell already. Of all the squad besides Raydor, Provenza is clearly the one whose opinion Rusty values most as he pulls him aside to make sure Provenza is okay with it. Provenza, who has been shown to be politically incorrect in the past, cares enough about Rusty that he doesn't care as long as he's not flamboyant, but tells him that being gay is the one thing that he really can't offer Rusty any advice on. When Rusty's mother comes back to ask him to help her get out of jail, he goes to Provenza and asks him for advice, not telling him what his mother said. While Provenza gives advice, he is left concerned by the boy's encounter and gets the security tape of the visit to see what happened. When he sees what Sharon Beck said to Rusty, concerned, he informs Raydor about it and shows her the tape. In another instance, when Emma Rios wanted to interview Rusty in preparation for the Phillip Stroh trial, Provenza was there to support him and stood up to Rios when she got rude and degrading with the young man. Rusty later agreed to talk to Rios but asked Provenza not to be there and to keep Raydor away too as he was worried about their negative opinions of him if he discussed his past with Rios in front of them. He asked Provenza to pretend keeping Raydor away was his idea instead of Rusty's and Provenza reluctantly agreed. When a decision had to be made about Rusty's future after the threatening letters came to light, Provenza acted as his advocate when Raydor decided to stay out of it. While Taylor and Raydor didn't want Rusty to know about the option of using him as bait to catch Wade Weller, Provenza pushed for him to know, knowing that he deserved the chance to make his own choice. While Provenza was prevented from telling Rusty due to Raydor and Taylor's insistence, his mentioning it leads Rusty to figure it out on his own and go with Provenza's idea. At the end of the series, after Rusty kills serial killer Phillip Stroh, Provenza takes credit for the shooting to protect Rusty even though Stroh having a gun makes the shooting justified. Provenza is cleared of the shooting by FID, but it's implied that at least Fritz Howard and Julio Sanchez suspect the truth though they let it go.

While Provenza's relationship with Sharon Raydor initially had a great deal of friction, the two grew closer over the course of the show and came to care greatly for each other. After having originally hated the idea of Sharon being in charge, Provenza feared who would become Assistant Chief if Sharon did not and expressed gratitude for her trust and affection for him. In season 6, when Sharon is diagnosed with cardiomyopathy, Provenza is one of the most vocally worried about her condition, attempting to convince Sharon to take a leave of absence for the sake of her health and yelling at two FBI agents after she collapsed while yelling at them. After Sharon dies, Provenza is visibly grief-stricken and delivers a moving eulogy for Sharon expressing his admiration for Sharon and her dedication to the rule of law, the very thing that had caused tension between them at the beginning. After the funeral, Provenza states that he was lucky to get through his eulogy without breaking down.

Awards and decorations
The following are the medals and service awards fictionally worn by Lieutenant Provenza.

References

Television characters introduced in 2005
Fictional Los Angeles Police Department detectives
Fictional police lieutenants
The Closer characters